The 2022–23 Campbell Fighting Camels basketball team represented Campbell University in the 2022–23 NCAA Division I men's basketball season. The Fighting Camels, led by 10th-year head coach Kevin McGeehan, played their home games at Gore Arena in Buies Creek, North Carolina as members of the Big South Conference.

Previous season
The Fighting Camels finished the 2021–22 season 16–13, 8–8 in Big South play to finish in second place in the North Division. In the Big South tournament, they defeated Presbyterian in the first round, before falling to Gardner–Webb in the quarterfinals.

Roster

Schedule and results

|-
!colspan=12 style=| Non-conference regular season

|-
!colspan=12 style=| Big South Conference regular season

|-
!colspan=12 style=| Big South tournament
|-

|-

|-

|-

|-

Source

References

Campbell Fighting Camels basketball seasons
Campbell Fighting Camels
Campbell Fighting Camels basketball
Campbell Fighting Camels basketball